Mirzwas,  is a village in the Laxmangarh administrative region of the Sikar district of Rajasthan state in India. The borders villages including Bidsar, Bidasar, Kheri Radan, Dundlod, and Sankhu .

History
Pre-Indian Independence
Before independence, the village was inhabited by Jats.

Village government
Mirzwas falls under BidaserPanchayat. The title of leader is Sarpanch, The panchayat has chosen ward members by the people through polling.

References

External links
 Details of Sarpanch in Sikar
 List of all villages of Rajasthan with their Panchayat Samiti
 Sikar District Official Web Page

Villages in Sikar district